Lepto may be:
 the Modern Greek term for the Greek lepton unit of currency
 an informal term for the leptospirosis disease, or for the Leptospira bacteria

See also 
 Lepton (disambiguation)